Bucatini, also known as perciatelli, is a thick spaghetti-like pasta with a hole running through the center. It is common throughout Lazio, particularly Rome. 

The similar ziti  consists of long hollow rods which are also smooth in texture and have square-cut edges; "cut ziti" are ziti cut into shorter tubes. There is also a wider version of ziti, zitoni .

Name 
The name comes from the Italian buco, meaning "hole", while bucato or its Neapolitan language variant perciato means "pierced".

Composition and use 
Bucatini is a tubed pasta made of hard durum wheat flour and water. The average cooking time is nine minutes. 

In Italian cuisine, bucatini is served with buttery sauces, guanciale, vegetables, cheese, eggs, and anchovies or sardines. One of the most common sauces to serve with bucatini is the Amatriciana sauce, bucatini all'amatriciana. It is traditionally made with guanciale, a type of cured meat taken from the pork jowl.

Raw bucatini can be used as a biodegradable drinking straw.

Preparation
Standard pasta machines will roll out sheets of flat pasta which are then cut into ribbons to make flat, ribbon-style pasta like fettuccine, tagliatelle, or pappardelle. Bucatini, on the other hand, has to be extruded rather than rolled.

The pasta dough is fed into a machine that forces it through a perforated disk, very similar to a meat grinder. The shape of the pasta depends on the shape of the perforations. Bucatini are made with a disk with tiny circular perforations, which forces the pasta dough to emerge in long tubes. The tubes are then trimmed off to the desired length and then either dried or cooked fresh.

Bucatini can be made at home with a stand mixer and a pasta extruder. Since bucatini has a hole in the middle, it must be handled gently so as not to squeeze the hole shut prior to eating.

See also

 Bigoli
 Macaroni
 Baked ziti

References

Cuisine of Lazio
Types of pasta